Krymsk is an air base of the Russian Air Force as part of the 4th Air and Air Defence Forces Army, Southern Military District. The main fighter regiment at the base has gone through a series of re-organizations and re-designations:
January 9, 2001: absorbed the 562nd Fighter Aviation Regiment, and renamed 3rd Guards Fighter Aviation Regiment.
January 12, 2009 renamed 6972nd Guards Aviation Base.

The base is home to the:
 1st Guards Composite Aviation Division HQ
 3rd Composite Guards Aviation Regiment with two squadrons of Sukhoi Su-27M3 (NATO: Flanker)

History
In 2011, the airfield was closed for renovation.

According to some reports, the airbase suffered from floods in Krymsk in July 2012.
According to an unnamed Izvestiya quoted eyewitness, the flow of water washed sand and rubble destined for the runway, under the water were not only pits, but also the basements and first floors of residential and administrative buildings of the military town. “...  About 15 combat aircraft flooded, which did not have time to take out before reconstruction. At the same time, the builders and the military were most afraid that aviation kerosene would be poured out due to the elements and the bombs would begin to tear  ”. At the same time, according to an unnamed representative of the military district, given in the same article, at the time of the reconstruction at the airfield there were only “aircraft taken out of service and in storage” and there was no fuel and ammunition.

The Russian Ministry of Defense denied reports of serious damage to the airfield. A spokesman for the Southern Military District said: “The message that the airfield in Krymsk was badly damaged and 200 million rubles would be required for its reconstruction is not true.” He also stressed that the airfield "is located on a hill, and the maximum amount of water at the very peak of the flood reached here a height of 10 centimeters".

After the floods, 5,500 military were deployed to the city of Krymsk to help rebuild the city, and a military campground was built on the airfield of the Krymsk airfield.

References

Russian Air Force bases
Airports in Krasnodar Krai